Ayodhya  Singh Upadhyay ‘Hari Oudh', (15 April 1865 – 16 March 1947) was a writer of Hindi literature. He was the Chairman of the Hindi Sahitya Sammelan and had been conferred the title of Vidyavachaspati.

Life
He worked in the Hindi Department of Banaras Hindu University until 1941 and then moved back to Nizamabad. After getting relieved from teaching assignment ‘Hari Oudh ji’ remained engaged in literary -service at village. His literature-service earned him considerable fame. He died in 1947 at Azamgarh.

Literary work

 Hindi Bhasha Aur Uske Sahitya Ka Vikas
 Karam Veer
 Ek Boond
 Phool aur Kanta
 Vaidehi Vanvas
 Priya Pravas
 Parijat
 Kalplata
 Fool Patte
 Ek Tinka

References

External links 
 Literary work of Hari Oudh
Important Persons, Azamgarh Administration

1865 births
1947 deaths
People from Azamgarh district
Hindi-language writers
19th-century Indian poets
Hindi-language poets
Poets from Uttar Pradesh
20th-century Indian poets